Burrinjuck may refer to:
 Electoral district of Burrinjuck, New South Wales, Australia;
Burrinjuck Dam which holds Burrinjuck Lake;
Burrinjuck village